Medemblik is a municipality and a town in the Netherlands, in the province of North Holland and the region of West-Frisia. It lies immediately south of the polder and former municipality of Wieringermeer.

History 
Medemblik was a prosperous trading town, when in 1282, Floris V, Count of Holland, successfully invaded West Friesland. He built several fortresses to control the region, one of which was Kasteel Radboud in Medemblik, and awarded Medemblik city rights in 1289. After Floris V was murdered in 1296, the local Frisian besieged the castle, but in 1297 an army from Holland thwarted their efforts to starve out the inhabitants, which included Medemblik citizens.

Several more attacks took place in the following centuries. The most notorious of these happened in June 1517, when Medemblik was attacked from mainland Frisia by about 4000 pirates known as the Arumer Zwarte Hoop, led by Pier Gerlofs Donia and Wijard Jelckama. Many citizens fled to the castle, which the pirates unsuccessfully besieged. Eventually, they took out their fury on the town, which burned to the ground. After this the band continued their marauding path on land throughout present day North Holland.

After Medemblik town walls were constructed in 1572, the castle lost its role as a refuge for the citizens, which led to its partially dismantling in 1578. Over the centuries the castle fell into decay, but in 1889 it became property of the crown and was restored to be used as a courthouse, which function it served until 1934. Anticipating the German invasion, the Rijksmuseum in September 1939 chose the castle as the initial hiding place of Rembrandt's Night Watch.

On January 1, 2007, Medemblik merged with the municipalities of Noorder-Koggenland and Wognum, yet retained its own name in the surviving municipality, even though it was the smallest of the three in population. Again on January 1, 2011, Medemblik merged with Andijk and Wervershoof into the municipality Medemblik.

The new city hall is the former office building of the DSB Bank in Wognum.

Tourism
Medemblik is best known in Europe for its sailing events. Medemblik further has a picturesque small innercity with many houses from the 17th and 18th century, two big churches, an old orphanage, a town hall and, of course, castle Radboud, which is just at the border of the innercity.
The city also hosts the Medemblik steam museum, housed in a decommissioned pumping station.

Transport
A heritage railway connects Medemblik with Hoorn.

Local government 

The municipal council of Medemblik consists of 29 seats, which are divided as follows:

 Hart voor Medemblik - 6 seats
 VVD - 5 seats
 CDA - 5 seats
 Gemeentebelangen - 5 seats
 Morgen! in Medemblik  - 4 seats
 D66 - 2 seats
 GroenLinks - 1 seat
 ChristenUnie - 1 seat

Notable people 

 Jan Albertsz Rotius (1624 in Medemblik – 1666) a Dutch painter
 A. C. Baantjer (1923 in Urk – 2010) a Dutch author of detective fiction and police officer
 Jan Vriend (born 1938 in Benningbroek) a Dutch classical music composer, conductor, organist and pianist
 Wim Cool (born 1943 in Gieten) a Dutch business consultant, mediator and politician
 Bep Vriend (born 1946 in Andijk) a Dutch bridge player and teacher
 Willem Vogelsang (born 1956 in Medemblik) academic and reserve soldier
 John Appel  (born 1958 in Wognum) a Dutch documentary filmmaker

Sport 
 Edith van Dijk (born 1973 in Haastrecht) a Dutch swimmer and 6-fold world champion.
 Yvonne Spigt (born 1988 in Wervershoof) a Dutch marathon skater and inline skater
 Irene Schouten (born 1992 in Andijk) a Dutch speed skater, bronze medallist in the 2018 Winter Olympic Games

Gallery

References

External links

Official website
Official tourist website

 
Municipalities of North Holland
Populated places in North Holland